Manlot (historically Labno Islet) is an island-barangay in northeastern Iloilo, Philippines. It is one of fourteen islands politically administered by the municipality of Carles.

Location and geography 

Manlot is a small wooded island northeast of the Panay Island coast in the Visayan Sea. The body of water between Calagnaan and nearby Binuluangan Island is known as the Nilidlaran Pass, which is divided into two narrow channels by Manlot. Although a part of Carles, Manlot is a quick 15 minute pumpboat ride from Estancia.

While the island belongs to the Manlot barangay, which is politically administered by Carles, Manlot island is privately owned by the Matta family.

Natural disasters

Typhoon Haiyan 

Typhoon Haiyan (locally known as Yolanda) passed over Manlot, along with the rest of Panay, on November 8, 2013. The typhoon beached a ship on the island.

See also

 List of islands in the Philippines
 List of islands
 Desert island

References

External links 
 Manlot Island on YouTube

Islands of Iloilo
Barangays of Iloilo
Uninhabited islands of the Philippines
Private islands of the Philippines